The Girl from Havana is a 1929 American pre-Code crime film directed by Benjamin Stoloff and written by Edwin J. Burke. The film stars Lola Lane, Paul Page, Kenneth Thomson, Natalie Moorhead, Warren Hymer and Joseph W. Girard. The film was released on September 22, 1929, by Fox Film Corporation.

Cast
Lola Lane as Joan Anders
Paul Page as Allan Grant
Kenneth Thomson as William Dane 
Natalie Moorhead as Lona Martin
Warren Hymer as Spike Howard
Joseph W. Girard as Dougherty
Adele Windsor as Babe Hanson
Marcia Chapman as Sally Green
Dorothy Brown as Toots Nolan
Juan Sedillo as Detective
Raymond López as Joe Barker

References

External links
 

1929 films
Fox Film films
American crime films
1929 crime films
Films directed by Benjamin Stoloff
American black-and-white films
1920s English-language films
1920s American films